Balice, historically also known as Balycze and Balicze, is a small Polish village in the Janikowo District.

Owned by an unknown noblemen since at least 1411, it was sold in 1464 along with nearby villages Kołuda Mała, Sielec, part of Sieczkowice and Lake Krzyte for 40 grzywnas of grosz's.

Between 1975 and 1998 administratively it was in the Bydgoszcz Voivodeship.

References

Villages in Inowrocław County